Jin Fu (born 25 September 1964) is a Chinese former swimmer who competed in the 1984 Summer Olympics and in the 1988 Summer Olympics.

References

1964 births
Living people
Chinese male breaststroke swimmers
Olympic swimmers of China
Swimmers at the 1984 Summer Olympics
Swimmers at the 1988 Summer Olympics
Asian Games medalists in swimming
Swimmers at the 1982 Asian Games
Swimmers at the 1986 Asian Games
Asian Games gold medalists for China
Asian Games silver medalists for China
Asian Games bronze medalists for China
Medalists at the 1982 Asian Games
Medalists at the 1986 Asian Games
20th-century Chinese people